Nickerlea is a genus of beetles in the family Cicindelidae, containing the following species:

 Nickerlea aesdorsalis Sumlin, 1997
 Nickerlea distypsideroides Horn, 1899
 Nickerlea nigrilabris Sumlin, 1997
 Nickerlea sloanei (Lea, 1898)

References

Cicindelidae